Phil Beal (born 8 January 1945) is an English former footballer who played as a central defender.

Career

Tottenham Hotspur
Beal was born in Godstone, Surrey. He played for Surrey boys and England Youth before signing as an amateur for Tottenham Hotspur in 1960 and became a professional at the club in 1962.

He made his debut as a defender against Aston Villa in 1963, and went on to make 16 appearances in that season.

By the start of the following season Danny Blanchflower had retired with Beal taking on the former captain's right half position. With the team in transition, he only made eight appearances that season.

The versatile player filled a variety of defensive positions and featured in 21 matches in 1965–66, started in 26 games in 1966–67, but did not feature in the  1967 FA Cup Final because of an injury. By the late 1960s he had fully established himself in the side and consistently showed his calm, authoritative and composed style.

Beal played in both League Cup winning sides against Aston Villa in 1970-71 and Norwich City in 1972-73. He played in both matches against Wolverhampton Wanderers in the 1972 UEFA Cup Final in which he collected a winners' medal, and in both legs of the 1974 UEFA Cup Final against Feyenoord.

Beal finished his career with Spurs in 1975 and made 420 appearances including three as substitute in all competitions, and scoring just one goal.

Later career
After leaving Spurs he played for Brighton & Hove Albion, Crewe Alexandra, Los Angeles Aztecs and Memphis Rogues.

After football
Today, Beal is a match day host at White Hart Lane.

Honours
Tottenham Hotspur
 UEFA Cup: 1972; runner up 1974
 Football League Cup: 1971, 1973

References

External links
 Phil Beal...cool, calm and sure
 Photo of Phil
 Spurs legends
 Phil Beal
 

Living people
1945 births
People from Godstone
English footballers
Association football defenders
UEFA Cup winning players
English Football League players
North American Soccer League (1968–1984) players
Tottenham Hotspur F.C. players
Brighton & Hove Albion F.C. players
Ilford F.C. players
Los Angeles Aztecs players
Memphis Rogues players
Crewe Alexandra F.C. players
Chelmsford City F.C. players
Oxford City F.C. players
English expatriate footballers
English expatriate sportspeople in the United States
Expatriate soccer players in the United States